Wistaston is a civil parish in Cheshire East, England.  It contains four buildings that are recorded in the National Heritage List for England as designated listed buildings.   Of these, one is listed at Grade II*, the middle of the three grades, and the others are at Grade II, the lowest grade.  The parish is partly residential and partly rural.  The listed buildings consist of three farmhouses and a church.

Key

Buildings

References

Citations

Sources

 

Listed buildings in the Borough of Cheshire East
Lists of listed buildings in Cheshire